The Ponte del Gran Caso is a Roman bridge across the Torrente Gran Caso, 2 km south of Ascoli Piceno in central Italy.

Today, the structure is surrounded by thick vegetation, and serves only to carry a wood shed. The bridge has a span of 6 m, a width of 3.3 m and is built of travertine. The walls of one ramp feature two flood arches, one of which has a segmental shape and runs from the ground to the quarter point of the main arch rib. A similar segmental relieving arch can be found at another Roman bridge in central Italy, the Ponte di Pioraco.

See also 
 List of Roman bridges
 Roman architecture
 Roman engineering

References

Sources 
 

Roman bridges in Italy
Deck arch bridges
Stone bridges in Italy